Herman E. Morse (born September 15, 1949) is an American politician. He is a member of the Missouri House of Representatives from the 151st District, serving since 2017. He is a member of the Republican party. Herman has been a resident of Missouri his whole life.

References

Living people
1949 births
Republican Party members of the Missouri House of Representatives
21st-century American politicians